This is a list of diplomatic missions in the Marshall Islands. There are four embassies in the capital, Majuro.

Embassies 
 Majuro

Non-resident embassies
 Resident in Manila 

 
  
  
  
  
 
 
 
  
 
 

 
 Resident in Canberra 

  
  
 
 
 
  
 

 Resident in Tokyo 

  
 
 
  
  
 
 
 
 
 
 
 
 
 
  
 
 
 
 
 
 

 Resident in Suva
 
 
 
 
 

 Resident elsewhere

  (New York City)
  (Jakarta)
  (Washington, D.C.)
  (Singapore)
  (Wellington)
 (Washington, D.C.)
  (Jerusalem)
  (Wellington)
  (Honolulu)
  (Hagåtña)
  (Seoul)
  (Wellington)

References

External links 
 Diplomatic missions in the Marshall Islands

Marshall Islands
Diplomatic missions
Diplomatic missions